This is a list of AM radio stations in the United States having call signs beginning with the letters KG to KM.

KG--

KH--

KI--

KJ--

KK--

KL--

KM--

See also
 North American call sign

AM radio stations in the United States by call sign (initial letters KG-KM)